This is an incomplete list of landmarks located in the Las Vegas metropolitan area.

Landmarks
Landmarks
Las Vegas